Svatopluk Habanec (born 22 September 1969) is a Czech former football player and manager of Třinec. His playing position was defender.

Habanec scored 11 goals in 28 games in the 2000–01 Czech 2. Liga, finishing among the leading scorers of the league.

He was announced as the new manager of Ústí nad Labem on 19 September 2007, replacing Libor Pala. He guided Ústí to the Czech First League after masterminding a second-place finish for the club in the 2009–10 Czech 2. Liga. Despite their relegation from the Czech First League in 2010/11, Habanec won the Czech 2. Liga with Ústí the following season. In August 2012, Habanec was appointed as the successor to Miroslav Soukup at Czech First League side 1. FC Slovácko.

Honours

Managerial
 Ústí nad Labem
Czech 2. Liga Winners (1): 2011–12
Czech 2. Liga Runners-Up (1): 2009–10

References

External links
 Manager Profile at idnes.cz 
 Player Profile at idnes.cz 
 Profile at fkusti.cz 

1969 births
Living people
Czech footballers
Czechoslovak footballers
Czech First League players
FK Teplice players
Czech football managers
Czech First League managers
FK Ústí nad Labem managers
1. FC Slovácko managers
Association football defenders
FC Zbrojovka Brno managers
Footballers from Brno
FK Fotbal Třinec managers
FK Teplice managers
Czech National Football League managers